Blair Cameron Bann (born 26 February 1988) is a Canadian male volleyball player. He is a member of the Canada men's national volleyball team and German club Düren, a participant in the 2016 Summer Olympics, and a gold and silver medalist at the NORCECA Men's Volleyball Championship in 2015 and 2013.

Personal life
Blair was born in Edmonton, Alberta to parents Robert and Gisele Bann. He started playing volleyball at the age of 14 for his school team, while playing for local club NAVC Gold during his high school years.

Career

Club
After playing for the UBC Thunderbirds for 5 years, Blair signed with German club Düren in 2011. He has spent the majority of his career there, apart from a one-year stint at Nantes Rezé MV in the 2013–14 season.

National Team
Blair first joined the national team in 2009. He has helped the team win gold and silver at the NORCECA Men's Volleyball Championship in 2015 and 2013, and was a member of the squad that finished 5th at the 2016 Summer Olympics. In June 2021, Bann was named to Canada's 2020 Olympic team.

Sporting Achievements

Club
 2014/2015  Bundesliga, with Düren

National Team
 2013  NORCECA Championship
 2015  NORCECA Championship
 2017  FIVB World League

Individual
 2009/2010 CIS Men's Volleyball Championship - Libero of the year
 2010/2011 CIS Men's Volleyball Championship - Libero of the year
 2011 Pan American Games - Best Digger
 2013 NORCECA Championship - Best Receiver
 2017 FIVB World League - Best Libero

References

External links
 
 

1988 births
Living people
Canadian men's volleyball players
Liberos
Place of birth missing (living people)
Olympic volleyball players of Canada
Sportspeople from Edmonton
University of British Columbia alumni
UBC Thunderbirds men's volleyball players
Volleyball players at the 2016 Summer Olympics
Volleyball players at the 2011 Pan American Games
Pan American Games competitors for Canada
Volleyball players at the 2020 Summer Olympics